Liam Kenny (born 2 November 1977 in Perth, Western Australia) is a professional squash player who represented Ireland by having dual residency in both Australia as well as Ireland. He reached a career-high world ranking of World No. 31 in April 2007.

Awards 
Liam Kenny was a 6 times Irish National Champion in 2001 and in 2004 to 2008. He also represents the Irish national team for the European Team Championship from 2001 to 2008 as well as the World Team Championship in 2001, 2003, 2005 and 2007.

In 2018, he won a World Masters title (40+ division).

References

External links 
 
 

Irish male squash players
Living people
1977 births
Sportspeople from Perth, Western Australia